Tennis returned to the Summer Olympic program as an exhibition and a demonstration event in 1968. Men's and women's singles and doubles and mixed doubles were held in both, a Demonstration tournament and an Exhibition tournament. The Demonstration tournament was held in Guadalajara and the Exhibition tournament in Mexico City.

Medal summary

Demonstration

Exhibition

References

External links
ITF Olympic site

 
1968 Summer Olympics events
1968
Olympics
1968 Olympics
Olympic demonstration sports